The Bert and Fay Havens House is a historic house in Hazelton, Idaho. It listed on the National Register of Historic Places on September 8, 1983, as part of a group of structures built from local lava rock in south central Idaho.

Description and history
The architecture displays elements of American Craftsman bungalow  and Western Stick styles. An off center porch extends across three quarters of the facade wrapping around the western side. Just to the east of the front entrance is the rear of a fireplace and chimney which extends piercing the extended gable east of its peak. The gable walls are stuccoed and the roof plan is complex with cross gables and a low shed roof covering the porch.

It was designed by owners Bert and Fay Havens and built my stonemason Fred Kilgore of Hazelton, Idaho in 1927. The stone was brought across a frozen Lake Wilson by Bert Havens with horse teams. In addition to the stone work Kilgore also did most of the exterior carpentry. Much of the interior carpentry was designed and executed by Fay Havens.

See also
 Historic preservation
 National Register of Historic Places listings in Jerome County, Idaho

References

External links
 * 

1927 establishments in Idaho
Bungalow architecture in Idaho
Houses completed in 1927
Houses in Jerome County, Idaho
Houses on the National Register of Historic Places in Idaho
National Register of Historic Places in Jerome County, Idaho